The Internet Architecture Board (IAB) is "a committee of the Internet Engineering Task Force (IETF) and  an advisory body of the Internet Society (ISOC). Its responsibilities include architectural oversight of IETF activities, Internet Standards Process oversight and appeal, and the appointment of the Request for Comments (RFC) Editor. The IAB is also responsible for the management of the IETF protocol parameter registries."

The IAB is responsible for:

Providing architectural oversight of Internet protocols and procedures
Liaising with other organizations on behalf of the Internet Engineering Task Force (IETF)
Reviewing appeals of the Internet standards process
Managing Internet standards documents (the RFC series) and protocol parameter value assignment
Confirming the Chair of the IETF and the IETF Area Directors
Selecting the Internet Research Task Force (IRTF) Chair
Acting as a source of advice and guidance to the Internet Society.

In its work, the IAB strives to:

Ensure that the Internet is a trusted medium of communication that provides a solid technical foundation for privacy and security, especially in light of pervasive surveillance,
Establish the technical direction for an Internet that will enable billions more people to connect, support the vision for an Internet of things, and allow mobile networks to flourish, while keeping the core capabilities that have been a foundation of the Internet's success, and
Promote the technical evolution of an open Internet without special controls, especially those which hinder trust in the network.

History and Origin 

The body which eventually became the IAB was created originally by the United States Department of Defense's Defense Advanced Research Projects Agency with the name Internet Configuration Control Board (ICCB) in 1979. Later, in 1983, the ICCB was reorganized by Dr. Barry Leiner, Vint Cerf's successor at DARPA, around a series of task forces considering different technical aspects of internetting. The re-organized group was named the Internet Activities Board.

The IAB set for itself seven principal foci for the period of 1989 to 1990. These were namely:

Operational Stability
User Services
OSI Coexistence
Testbed Facilities
Security
Getting Big
Getting Fast

It finally became the Internet Architecture Board, under ISOC, during January 1992, as part of the Internet's transition from a U.S.-government entity to an international, public entity.

Activities
Activities of the IAB include:

Workshops
 COVID-19 Network Impacts Workshop, 2020
 Exploring Synergy between Content Aggregation and the Publisher Ecosystem Workshop 2019
 Design Expectations vs. Deployment Reality in Protocol Development Workshop 2019     
     * Position Papers: DEDR Workshop
 Explicit Internet Naming Systems (EName) Workshop 2017
 Internet of Things Software Update Workshop (IoTSU) 2016
     * IoT Semantic Interoperability Workshop 2016
 Managing Radio Networks in an Encrypted World (MaRNEW) Workshop 2015
 Coordinating Attack Response at Internet Scale (CARIS) Workshop 2015
     * Call For Papers 
     * Agenda: Coordinating Attack Response at Internet Scale (CARIS) Workshop
 IAB Workshop on Stack Evolution in a Middlebox Internet (SEMI) 2015
 W3C/IAB workshop on Strengthening the Internet Against Pervasive Monitoring (STRINT) 2014
 IAB Workshop on Internet Technology Adoption and Transition (ITAT) 2013
 IAB / IRTF Workshop on Congestion Control for Interactive Real-Time Communication 2012
     * Workshop on Congestion Control: Position Papers
     * Congestion Control Workshop Agenda and Materials
 Interconnecting Smart Objects with the Internet Workshop 2011
     * Tutorial on Interconnecting Smart Objects with the Internet
     * Position Papers
     * Agenda
 Internet Privacy Workshop 2010
     * Slides Presentations
     * Minutes of the IAB/W3C/ISOC/MIT Internet Privacy Workshop
     * Meeting Minutes
     * Accepted Position Papers
 Routing and Addressing Workshop 2006
 Unwanted Traffic Workshop 2006
 IAB Wireless Internetworking Workshop 2000
Technical programs and administrative support groups
     * RFC Editor Program: The RFC Series Oversight Committee (RSOC)
     * RFC Editor Future Development Program
     * Plenary Planning Program
     * Internet Threat Model (model-t) Program
     * IETF-IANA Group
     * Evolvability, Deployability, & Maintainability (EDM) Program
 Concluded Programs
      * Security Program
      * Privacy Program
      * Privacy Reviews
      * IPv6 Privacy Survey
      * Privacy and Security Program
      * Names and Identifiers Program
      * Liaison Oversight Program
      * ITU-T Coordination Program
      * IP Stack Evolution Program
      * IP Evolution
      * Internationalization Program
      * IETF Protocol Registries Oversight Committee (IPROC)
      * IAB Tools and Processes Program
      * Emergency Services

IAB appointments and confirmations
 Community Coordination Group (CCG): Russ Housley (2017-2021), Barry Leiba (2017-2021), Tim Wicinski (2018-2022)
 IANA Stewardship Transition Coordination Group (ICG): Russ Housley, Lynn St Amour
 ICANN Board of Directors Liaison: Harald Alvestrand: (2018–present)
 ICANN Root Zone Evolution Review Committee (RZERC): Tim (April, 2020–2021)
 ICANN NomCom: Peter Koch, 2020
 ICANN Technical Liaison Group (TLG)	: Warren Kumari (2019-2021), Petr Špaček (2020-2022)

Responsibilities

The IAB's current responsibilities include:

Architectural Oversight: The IAB provides oversight of, and occasional commentary on, aspects of the architecture for the network protocols and procedures used by the Internet.
Standards Process Oversight and Appeal: The IAB provides oversight of the process used to create Internet Standards. The IAB serves as an appeal board for complaints of improper execution of the standards process, through acting as an appeal body in respect of an Internet Engineering Steering Group (IESG) standards decision.
Request for Comments series: The IAB is responsible for editorial management and publication of the Request for Comments (RFC) document series.
Internet Assigned Numbers Authority: In conjunction with the Internet Corporation for Assigned Names and Numbers (ICANN), the IAB is responsible for the administration of the assignment of IETF protocol parameter values by the Internet Assigned Numbers Authority (IANA).
External Liaison: The IAB acts as representative of the interests of the IETF in liaison relationships with other organizations concerned with standards and other technical and organizational issues relevant to the worldwide Internet.
Advice to the Internet Society: The IAB acts as a source of advice and guidance to the board of trustees and Officers of ISOC concerning technical, architectural, procedural, and (where appropriate) policy matters pertaining to the Internet and its enabling technologies.
Internet Engineering Steering Group Confirmation: The IAB confirms the IETF Chair and IESG Area Directors, from nominations provided by the IETF Nominating Committee.
Internet Research Task Force Chair: The IAB selects a chair of the IRTF for a renewable two-year term.

RFC1087 – Ethics and the Internet and a rise to modernity
The IAB takes a formal stance on what constitutes proper use of the Internet in their 1989 memo, RFC 1087: “Ethics and the Internet.”  They introduce their contemporary version of the Internet, which at the time was in its nascent stages, serving primarily as a tool for communication of research in the scientific community, and identify the use of this internet as a “privilege.”

The IAB then proclaims as unethical any activity which:
 seeks to gain unauthorized access to the resources of the Internet,
 disrupts the intended use of the Internet,
 wastes resources (people, capacity, computer) through such actions,
 destroys the integrity of computer-based information
 compromises the privacy of users.
 
This memo was written at a time during which the Internet existed in the general research milieu, but since that time the Internet has evolved greatly and expanded in its user-base. The IAB has accordingly taken new stances on ethical and secure Internet use, such as in RFC 8890, where the IAB identifies protecting end users as the first priority in their maintenance of the Internet.

As such, though their core principles are the same, the IAB's priority for protection has shifted from the technical and scientific community to the community of day-to-day users. In another memo RFC7624, the IAB takes a firm stance against pervasive mass surveillance through the use of the Internet on the part of national intelligence agencies, saying that it is necessary that the Internet technical community, including itself, “address the vulnerabilities exploited [by mass surveillance campaigns]...to ensure that the Internet can be trusted by [its] users.”

RFC 2850 - Charter of the Internet Architecture Board (IAB)
RFC 2850 establishes the structure and purpose of the IAB. The RFC specifies the following:
 IAB membership: the IAB has 13 members, 1 being the chair of the Internet Engineering Task Force (IETF). These members are appointed to 2 year terms.
 The Role of the IAB: The IAB serves to provide Architectural Oversight for Internet procedures, and to provide oversight in the process of creating Internet standards, including appeals. Furthermore, the IAB acts as a liaison to the Internet Society (ISOC) to advice regarding architectural and technical issues.
 IAB Organization: The 13 members of the IAB choose 1 member to serve as the chair of the IAB for a 1-year term. There is no limit to the number of terms that the chair can serve. The executive director of the IAB is chosen by the chair. The IAB also has the power to designate the chair of the Internet Research Task Force (IRTF) for a 2-year term.
 Decision-making: in most situations, the IAB aims to come to unanimous decisions on matters. When this is not possible, the IAB must come to a consensus of at least 7 members before taking action.
 Openness and confidentiality: The IAB makes all meetings open to the public by making it available online, and also publishes RFCs regularly to make its conclusions generally available. In some situations, however, confidential information is excluded for privacy reasons.

RFC 2026 - The Internet Standards Process
The Internet Standards process is an activity of the Internet Society that is organized and managed on behalf of the Internet community by the Internet Architecture Board (IAB) and the Internet Engineering Steering Group (IESG). The Internet Standards Process is concerned with all protocols, procedures, and conventions that are used in or by the Internet. The process of creating an Internet Standard is straightforward: a specification undergoes a period of development and several iterations of review by the Internet community and revision based upon experience, is adopted as a Standard by the appropriate body (either the IAB or the IESG), and is published. Each distinct version of an Internet standards-related specification is published as part of the "Request for Comments" (RFC) document series.  This archival series is the official publication channel for Internet standards documents and other publications of the IESG, IAB, and Internet community. The complete Internet Standards Process is itself specified by an RFC, namely RFC 2026.

RFC 8980 - Workshop on Design Expectations vs. Deployment Reality in Protocol Development 
The RFC 8980 workshop was held in February 2021, where the IAB discussed several topics around security protocols, including:

• Email standards, which presumed many providers running in a largely uncoordinated fashion but have seen both significant market consolidation and a need for coordination to defend against spam and other attacks. The coordination and centralized defense mechanisms scale better for large entities; these have fueled additional consolidation.

• The Domain Name System (DNS), which presumed deep hierarchies but has often been deployed in large, flat zones, leading to the nameservers for those zones becoming critical infrastructure. Future developments in DNS may see concentration through the use of globally available common resolver services, which evolve rapidly and can offer better security. Paradoxically, concentration of these queries into a few services creates new security and privacy concerns.

• The Web, which is built on a fundamentally decentralized design but is now often delivered with the aid of Content Delivery Networks (CDNs). Their services provide scaling, distribution, and prevention of denial of service in ways that new entrants and smaller systems operators would find difficult to replicate. While truly small services and truly large services may each operate using only their own infrastructure, many others are left with the only practical choice being the use of a globally available commercial service.

The workshop resulted in the following recommendations by the IAB:

• Develop and document a modern threat model.

• Continue discussion of consolidation/centralization issues.

• Document architectural principles, e.g., (re)application of the end-to-end principle.

Chairs 
The following people have served as chair of the IAB:

 David D. Clark – 1981 to July 1989
 Vint Cerf – July 1989 to July 1991
 Lyman Chapin – July 1991 to March 1993
 Christian Huitema – March 1993 to July 1995
 Brian Carpenter – July 1995 to March 2000
 John Klensin – March 2000 to March 2002
 Leslie Daigle – March 2002 to March 2007
 Olaf Kolkman – March 2007 to March 2011
 Bernard Aboba – March 2011 to March 2013
 Russ Housley- March 2013 to March 2015
 Andrew Sullivan – March 2015 to March 2017
 Ted Hardie – March 2017 to March 2020
 Mirja Kühlewind - March 2020 to present

Current Members

Related Organizations 
 IETF Administration LLC - This organization provides legal advice for the IAB 
 Request for Comments (RFC) Editor - The RFC series contains documents released by 4 organizations: The Internet Architecture Board (IAB), the Internet Engineering Task Force (IETF), the Internet Research Task Force (IRTF), and Independent Submissions 
  Internet Assigned Numbers Authority (IANA)
  Internet Research Task Force (IRTF) - The IRTF works on long-term projects related to the Internet 
 The IETF Trust - The IETF Trust holds intellectual property licensing and other licensing related to the Internet 
 The Internet Society (ISOC)

References

Further reading
 Carpenter, Brian (editor), Charter of the Internet Architecture Board (RFC 2850, May 2000)
 Kozierok, Charles, The TCP/IP Guide (Sep 2005)
 Comer, Douglas, Internetworking with TCP/IP vol I: Principles, Protocols, and Architecture (1991)

External links 
 
 List of IAB Members

Internet Architecture Board
Board
Internet ethics
Internet governance organizations
1979 establishments in the United States
DARPA projects